Academic Festival Overture, Op. 80, by Johannes Brahms, was one of a pair of contrasting concert overtures — the other being the Tragic Overture, Op. 81. Brahms composed the work during the summer of 1880 as a tribute to the University of Breslau, which had notified him that it would award him an honorary doctorate in philosophy.

Background
Initially, Brahms had contented himself with sending a simple handwritten note of acknowledgment to the University, since he loathed the public fanfare of celebrity. However, the conductor Bernhard Scholz, who had nominated him for the degree, convinced him that protocol required him to make a grander gesture of gratitude. The University expected nothing less than a musical offering from the composer. "Compose a fine symphony for us!" he wrote to Brahms. "But well orchestrated, old boy, not too uniformly thick!"

Structure and instrumentation
Brahms, who was known to be an ironic joker, filled his quota by creating a "very boisterous potpourri of student drinking songs à la Suppé" in an intricately designed structure made to appear loose and episodic, thus drawing on the "academic" for both his sources and their treatment.

The work sparkles with some of the finest virtues of Brahms's orchestral technique, sometimes applied for comic effect, such as the bassoons that inflate the light subject of "Fuchslied" (Was kommt dort von der Höh?). The inventive treatment includes tunes appropriated from the student ditties "Fuchslied", "Wir hatten gebauet ein stattliches Haus", "Hört, ich sing das Lied der Lieder", and most memorably, the broad, triumphant finale on "Gaudeamus igitur", which succinctly engages Brahms's sophisticated mastery of counterpoint, further fulfilling the "academic" aspect of his program, cheekily applied to the well-worn melody. Brahms manages to evoke ravishing euphoria without sacrificing his commitment to classical balance.

The blend of orchestral colors is carefully planned and highlighted in the piece, which, in spite of Scholz's request, calls for one of the largest ensembles for any of his compositions: piccolo, two flutes, two oboes, two clarinets (both doubling in B and C clarinets), two bassoons, contrabassoon, four horns (two in C and two in E), three C trumpets, three trombones, one tuba, timpani, bass drum, cymbals, triangle, and strings.

The Overture consists of four continuous sections:

Convocation for the premiere and awarding of the degree

The composer himself conducted the premiere of the overture, and received his honorary degree, at a special convocation held by the University on January 4, 1881. To the chagrin (or mischievous delight) of many of the academics in the audience, there was an "ironic" contrast between the mood of the student drinking songs and the seriousness of a ceremony.

Reception
Because of its easily grasped structure, its lyrical warmth, and its excitement and humor, the work has remained a staple of today's concert-hall repertoire. A typical performance lasts around ten minutes.

References in popular culture
Cary Grant in his role as Dr. Noah Praetorius conducts the Overture at the beginning and end of the 1951 Joseph L. Mankiewicz/Darryl F. Zanuck film People Will Talk, and part of the piece can also be heard in the opening theme of the 1978 film National Lampoon's Animal House, an ironic gesture given that this piece was partly based on German fraternity drinking songs.

In the 1967 film Bedazzled, Dudley Moore, as a pretentious pseudo-intellectual Welsh student, and Eleanor Bron lie on the floor listening to the beginning of the Overture on an LP until the record begins to skip (thanks to a scratch deliberately made in the LP by Peter Cook as the Devil earlier in the film).

The song "Catch a Falling Star", made famous by Perry Como, was based on the third melody in the final movement, just before the "Gaudeamus igitur". The final melody provides the tune for Greenleaf High School's school song in the 1997 movie In and Out.

Notes

External links
Program notes from the Los Angeles Philharmonic
 

Compositions by Johannes Brahms
Concert overtures
1880 compositions
German patriotic songs